Pseudanarta caeca is a species of cutworm or dart moth in the family Noctuidae. It is found in North America.

The MONA or Hodges number for Pseudanarta caeca is 9604.

References

Further reading

External links

 
 

Xylenini
Moths described in 1913